Slivovo may refer to:

Slivovo, Burgas Province, Bulgaria
Slivovo, Gabrovo Province, Bulgaria
Slivovo, Debarca, North Macedonia